Nikolay Penchev (born 22 May 1992) is a Bulgarian professional volleyball player, a former member of the Bulgaria national team, and a participant at the Olympic Games London 2012.

Personal life
Nikolay Penchev was born in Plovdiv, Bulgaria. His father is a former volleyball player. He has three brothers – older Chavdar (born 1987) and younger twin brothers, Chono and Rozalin (born 11 December 1994), who are also volleyball players. Chono is a setter, Rozalin plays as opposite or outside hitter.

Career

Clubs
Penchev spent the 2012/2013 season in Effector Kielce. In 2013, he moved to Asseco Resovia and signed a two–year contract. In his first season in the new club, he won the Polish SuperCup and a silver medal of the Polish Championship after losing to PGE Skra Bełchatów in the final matches. In April 2015, alongside Asseco Resovia, he won the Polish Championship. In April 2015, he signed a new one–year contract with Resovia.

In May 2016, Penchev signed a one–year contract with another Polish team, PGE Skra Bełchatów.

Honours

Clubs
 CEV Champions League
  2014/2015 – with Asseco Resovia

 National championships
 2013/2014  Polish SuperCup, with Asseco Resovia
 2014/2015  Polish Championship, with Asseco Resovia
 2017/2018  Polish SuperCup, with PGE Skra Bełchatów
 2017/2018  Polish Championship, with PGE Skra Bełchatów
 2022  Ukraine Cup, with VC Epicentr-Podolyany

Youth national team
 2010  CEV U20 European Championship

Individual awards
 2010: CEV U20 European Championship – Best Receiver

References

External links

 
 Player profile at LegaVolley.it 
 Player profile at PlusLiga.pl 
 Player profile at Volleybox.net

1992 births
Living people
Sportspeople from Plovdiv
Bulgarian men's volleyball players
Olympic volleyball players of Bulgaria
Volleyball players at the 2012 Summer Olympics
Bulgarian expatriate sportspeople in Italy
Expatriate volleyball players in Italy
Bulgarian expatriate sportspeople in Poland
Expatriate volleyball players in Poland
Bulgarian expatriate sportspeople in France
Expatriate volleyball players in France
Bulgarian expatriate sportspeople in Ukraine
Expatriate volleyball players in Ukraine
Effector Kielce players
Resovia (volleyball) players
Skra Bełchatów players
Projekt Warsaw players
Warta Zawiercie players
Cuprum Lubin players
Stal Nysa players
Outside hitters